Pakan District is an administrative district in Sarikei Division, Sarawak, Malaysia, covering an area of . The town of Pakan is the capital of the Pakan district, located 45 km from the town of Sarikei.

History
The Pakan area was administered as a sub-district since 1973 which was put under the jurisdiction of Julau District. On 1 March 2002, the area was upgraded into a district and was put under the administration of Sarikei Division.

Demography
There has been a marginal growth of Pakan District population of 1.38% from 1991 to 2000. Meanwhile, from 2000 to 2010, there is a marginal growth of 0.37%.
{| class="wikitable" style="text-align: center;"
! Year
| 1991 || 2000 ||2010
|-
! Totalpopulation
| 12,882 || 14,591 || 15,135
|-
|}

Economy
According to the figures released by Malaysian Ministry of Rural Development in 2019, Pakan district is the poorest district in Malaysia with household income registered at RM 2,760 per month. Therefore, Pakan district is under the implementation of socio-economic development programmes of the ministry.

Town and villages

Pakan

Pakan district office administers the Pakan District.

Nanga Entaih
Nanga Entaih was connected to tarred road in September 2019.

Nanga Wak

There is an earth road connecting Nanga Wak to Ulu Julau. As of 2016, there is a lack of water and electricity supply in the area.

Nanga Kara

There is a primary school in this area.

Ulu Entabai
The place is located at three-hour drive from the town of Pakan. Nanga Kemalih public health clinic and SK Ulu Entabai (primary school) are located here. A development project consisted of a new clinic, administrative block, and staff quarters opposite SK Ulu Entabai was commenced in 2017. The project began construction in 2019 and reached 70% progress by March 2021.

References